Karasungur can refer to:

 Karasungur, Çınar
 Karasungur, Kovancılar